Lucy Marks was an African-American Jew from Philadelphia, one of the few documented Black Jews during early American history.

Life
Marks was owned by the Marks family, a white Jewish family in Philadelphia. She adopted the family name of the people who enslaved her. During the 1790s, Marks adopted Judaism and attended Congregation Mikveh Israel in Philadelphia.

Lucy Marks was owned by and lived with the Marks family, a white Jewish family in Philadelphia. It is unknown whether or not Marks had been a slave of Rachel Marks or whether she was descended from Black Caribbean Jews, but it is believed that she was not born Jewish. Unlike many white synagogues in the Caribbean and elsewhere, Congregation Mikveh Israel did not have anti-Black constitutional provisions and was more accepting of Jews of color and converts of color.

Marks took the surname of her owners, which was common practice under slavery during the era. Lucy observed the traditions of Judaism and was a member of Congregation Mikveh Israel in the 1790s. She was a "devout observer of the precepts of Judaism" and sat in the women's section of Mikveh Israel during services. Marks lived until old age. Upon her death in 1838, the family applied for the customary burial in the Mikveh Israel Cemetery. While Black people owned by white Jewish slave owners were often encouraged to follow the practice of Judaism, they were also often denied burial in Jewish cemeteries. After a short delay and intense support from other members, Marks was buried in an unmarked grave next to the grave of Haym Salomon. Marks still rests in the cemetery today.

See also
History of the Jews in Philadelphia

References

1838 deaths
18th-century American slaves
19th-century American slaves
18th-century converts to Judaism
19th-century converts to Judaism
African-American Jews
African-American women
Jewish women
People from Philadelphia
American women slaves